From March 11 to June 5, 1956, voters of the Democratic Party chose its nominee for president in the 1956 United States presidential election. Former Illinois Governor Adlai Stevenson was selected as the nominee through a series of primary elections and caucuses culminating in the 1956 Democratic National Convention held from August 13 to August 17, 1956, in Chicago, Illinois. This was the party's second consecutive nomination of Stevenson.

Primary race
Estes Kefauver sought the Democratic presidential nomination, as he had in 1952. Initially, he again won some Democratic Party presidential primaries. In the March 13, 1956 New Hampshire presidential primary, Kefauver defeated Stevenson, his only formidable opponent for the nomination, by a margin of 21,701 to 3,806. A week later, Kefauver  defeated Stevenson in the March 20, 1956 Minnesota presidential primary, winning 245,885 votes compared to Stevenson's 186,723 votes. Kefauver was also victorious in the Wisconsin presidential primary.

By April 1956, "it appeared that Kefauver was on his way to a primary sweep matching the spectacular performance in 1952." Stevenson, however, was able to defeat Kefauver in the 1956 Oregon, Florida and California primaries and, overall, and ultimately won more primary votes than Kefauver before being re-nominated as the Democratic presidential nominee at the 1956 Democratic national convention.

Candidates

Debates

Televised Kefauver-Stevenson debate
One of the first televised United States presidential debates was held as an hour long one-on-one debate between the party's top-two contenders, Kefauver and Stevenson. The debate was held in Miami, Florida ahead of the state's primary.

The Russell Baker of The New York Times  wrote that the two contenders took near-identical stances on most of the issues discussed in the debate.

Polling

National polling

See also
1956 Republican Party presidential primaries

References